Chaudhvin Ka Chand is a 1960 Indian Hindi-language film directed by Mohammed Sadiq. This film was a super-hit at box-office, and became one of the top-grossing films of 1960. A production of Guru Dutt, the film centers on a love triangle between Dutt, Rehman and Waheeda Rehman, and features music by Ravi. After the disastrous box office performance of Kaagaz Ke Phool, Guru Dutt ventured into the idea of producing a commercial project to protect his studio from ruins. The next commercial venture by the studio was Chaudhvin ka Chand, which was a successful comeback film for Guru Dutt and saved Guru Dutt's production studio from ruins.

The film is considered a notable Muslim-social. It was ranked #28 in 2003 Outlook Magazine poll of 25 Leading Indian Directors for “Best Bollywood Movies of all time”. Filmfare listed it among “Seven Muslim socials you must watch”. Its album was ranked #30 in Top 100 Bollywood Albums by Film Companion. The film's title track “Chaudhvin Ka Chand” became especially popular and is noted for picturization of the song sequence. The song is regarded as one of the most acclaimed romantic ballads in history and one of the most loved filmi songs of all time.

In 2014, the film's screenplay was published as a book, titled Chaudhvin Ka Chand: The Original Screenplay, by the film historians Dinesh Raheja and Jitendra Kothari. The film also entered into the 2nd Moscow International Film Festival.

Plot 
The setting is the city of Lucknow in northern India, where Islamic culture flourished. Aslam and Nawab are two best friends looking for a wife and end up in an accidental love triangle.  

At a gathering they attend, the ladies exchange veils for fun. This causes the two best friends who live in this city to accidentally fall in love with the same woman named Jameela. Jameela is in love with Aslam and marries him. After marriage, Aslam figures out that his friend Nawab had fallen in love with Jameela as well. However, because the veils had been switched by the girls earlier he was unaware of this. Aslam wants nothing but his friend Nawab to be happy and  tries to act in a way that would cause Jameela to divorce him, so that Nawab can then marry her. However, Jameela loves Aslam despite this and will not leave him. Eventually Nawab realizes the misunderstanding and is overcome with grief to cause his friend so much sorrow. He is devastated, and commits suicide knowing this will ensure there are no obstacles in the way now for Aslam to love Jameela.

Cast 
Guru Dutt as Aslam
Waheeda Rehman as Jameela
Rehman as Nawab
Johnny Walker as Mirza Musarraddique Shaida
Minoo Mumtaz as Tameezan
Mumtaz Begum as Nawab's Mother
Tun Tun as Naseeban

Music 
Guru Dutt's music composer of earlier films S. D. Burman had warned him not to make Kaagaz Ke Phool (1959), which resembled his own life. When Guru Dutt insisted on making the film, Burman said that would be his last film with Guru Dutt. Hence, the music composing of this film was offered to composer Ravi and was critically acclaimed, and the lyrics by Shakeel Badayuni. The title song is sung by Mohammed Rafi. The other hit songs from this film are "Mera Yaar Bana Hai Dulha", also sung by Mohammed Rafi, often played in wedding ceremony and mujra song "Dil Ki Kahani Rang Layi Hai", sung by Asha Bhosle.

Track listing 
Ravi has composed the music of the film and Shakeel Badayuni wrote the lyrics.

Awards 

 8th Filmfare Awards:

Won

 Best Lyricist – Shakeel Badayuni for "Chaudhvin Ka Chand"
 Best Male Playback Singer – Mohammed Rafi for "Chaudhvin Ka Chand"
 Best Art Direction – Biren Nag

Nominated

 Best Supporting Actor – Rehman
 Best Music Director – Ravi
 Best Story – Saghir Usmani

References

External links 

1960 films
1960 drama films
1960s Hindi-language films
Films scored by Ravi
Films set in Lucknow
Films set in Uttar Pradesh
Films shot in Lucknow
Films with screenplays by Abrar Alvi
Indian romantic drama films
Films directed by M. Sadiq